Microacmaeodera is a genus of beetles in the family Buprestidae, containing the following species:

 Microacmaeodera aruensis (Théry, 1923)
 Microacmaeodera belli (Kerremans, 1893)
 Microacmaeodera cuneiformis Volkovitsh, 2007
 Microacmaeodera grootaerti Holynski, 1995
 Microacmaeodera kubani Volkovitsh & Bellamy, 1995
 Microacmaeodera kucerai Volkovitsh, 2007
 Microacmaeodera longicornis (Cobos, 1966)
 Microacmaeodera macgregori Bellamy & Volkovitsh, 1992
 Microacmaeodera ohmomoi Volkovitsh, 2007
 Microacmaeodera rolciki Volkovitsh, 2007
 Microacmaeodera thailandica Volkovitsh & Bellamy, 1995
 Microacmaeodera wittmeri Volkovitsh, 1986

References

Buprestidae genera